Perishability is used in marketing to describe the way in which service capacity cannot be stored for sale in the future.  It is a key concept of services marketing.

Other key characteristics of services include intangibility, inseparability, fluctuating demand, pricing of services, heterogeneity and variability.

References 

Services marketing